Partaw Naderi is a social activist, author and poet from Afghanistan. In 1968, he moved to Kabul and studied at the Teachers' Training College and then at the Faculty of Natural Sciences. It was during these years that he published his first poems in various literary magazines in Kabul. 

Partaw Naderi was born in 1953 in Badakhshan Province  of Afghanistan. He is an ethnic Tajik.

References 

1953 births
20th-century Afghan poets
Ethnic Tajik people
Afghan Tajik people
Date of birth missing (living people)
Tajik poets
Living people
21st-century Afghan poets